Čáslavsko is a municipality and village in Pelhřimov District in the Vysočina Region of the Czech Republic. It has about 100 inhabitants.

Administrative parts
Villages of Jelenov, Kopaniny, Skočidolovice and Štědrovice are administrative parts of Čáslavsko.

References

Villages in Pelhřimov District